Athens ERA-1 Transmitter is a transmission tower in Agios Stefanos, Attica, Greece.

The facility broadcasts the program of ERA-1 on 729 kHz with 150 kW in the standard mediumwave band. Athens ERA-1 transmitter uses as antenna a 210 metres tall mast radiator insulated against ground, which is a lattice structure with triangular cross section.

References

Radio masts and towers in Europe
ERA-1 transmitter
Dionysos, Greece